Alvarus Eleazer Gilbert (August 17, 1825 – August 20, 1891) was an American farmer and politician.

Gilbert was born in Alexander, New York and went to the public schools. In 1839, he moved to Wisconsin Territory and settled in New Berlin. In the 1850s, Gilbert, his wife, and family moved to Illinois. In 1861, they returned to New Berlin and bought a farm. Gilbert served on the Waukesha County, Wisconsin Board of Supervisors. In 1878 and 1879, Gilbert served in the Wisconsin State Assembly and was a Republican. Gilbert was suffering from poor health and depression. He committed suicide by hanging him in a barn on his farm in New Berlin, Wisconsin.

Notes

People from Alexander, New York
People from New Berlin, Wisconsin
Farmers from Wisconsin
County supervisors in Wisconsin
Republican Party members of the Wisconsin State Assembly
Suicides by hanging in Wisconsin
American politicians who committed suicide
1825 births
1891 deaths
19th-century American politicians